Jason Read (born December 24, 1977) rowed in the bow seat in the 2004 Summer Olympics Gold medal-winning U.S. Men's Rowing Team Eight.

He attended the Hun School of Princeton, where he took up rowing, continuing the sport at Temple University. As a volunteer with the Amwell Valley – Ringoes Rescue Squad in Ringoes, he was among those who responded after the September 11, 2001 terrorist attacks.

Read was a member of the U.S. rowing team for the 2008 Summer Olympics.

References

1977 births
Living people
American male rowers
Hun School of Princeton alumni
Olympic gold medalists for the United States in rowing
People from East Amwell Township, New Jersey
Rowers at the 2004 Summer Olympics
Rowers at the 2011 Pan American Games
Temple Owls rowers
World Rowing Championships medalists for the United States
Medalists at the 2004 Summer Olympics
Pan American Games gold medalists for the United States
Pan American Games medalists in rowing
Temple Owls rowing coaches
Medalists at the 2011 Pan American Games